Black Diamond is a populated place situated in Cochise County, Arizona, United States.

References

Populated places in Cochise County, Arizona